Veija "Veijo" Oskari Baltzar (born June 9, 1942) is a Romani author and visual artist from Finland.

Baltzar's artistic output comprises over 72 literary works, including novels, short stories, plays and musicals, a film, librettos and TV screenplays. Baltzar has described his childhood as extremely poor but very rich socially and spiritually.

Literary works 

Baltzar's first novel Polttava tie, "The Burning Road" (1968, published in Swedish 1969 as Brännande väg) was successful and brought attention to him. It was the first Finnish book that was written about the Roma and their culture, seen through the eyes of a Roma. Verikihlat (1969), "The Engagement of Blood", is a story about love, hate and blood revenge. In Mari (1972), Baltzar discusses women and their position inside the tribe. Baltzar's 1988 mythic novel Käärmeenkäräjäkivi was a nominee for the Finlandia Prize.

Musta tango (1990), "The Black Tango", tells about Gypsies in modern Finnish society after they moved to the suburbs. Baltzar has also written a novel for children about Gypsies (Mustan Saaran kristallipallo, The Crystal Ball of Black Sarah) in 1978. Phuro, published in 2000, is an extensive epic novel about the Roma living in Central Europe, the saga of a family, which tells a tale of the community through that of the relatives. The latest novel by Veijo Baltzar, In love and war, published in 2008, tells about the tragic faith of European Roma in the middle of the Second World War.

Theatre 

Veijo Baltzar has written several plays, most of them focusing on Roma, but there are also plays about myths, religion and war. He was the founder of the first and only Roma theatre in Nordic countries, Drom Theatre in 1976. At the beginning of the 1980s, Baltzar worked as a leading teacher in the Theatre Academy of Finland. Baltzar wrote and directed tens of tragedies, poetic plays and musicals to the group.

In the 1990s Baltzar continued playwriting and directing, as well as taught in municipal and state institutions. In Imatra, he wrote and directed a folk opera Orli with 200 actors 1994–1997. The premiere of so-called "second" Orli, patronaged by Finland's Prime Minister Paavo Lipponen, took place in the Finlandia concert hall in March 1997. Since 2013, Veijo Baltzar has produced theatrical and music work at the premises of Alexander theatre.

Pedagogical work 

When Baltzar started managing his own theatre and teaching / directing in 1976, he created his own pedagogical method based on multicultural emotional intelligence, known as Intercultural Experiential Education. In 2012, Baltzar published a polemic work Towards Experiential Philosophy (Kokemuspohjainen filosofia in Finnish), in which he introduces his pedagogical method and its philosophical and educational background. The book was published in English in 2014.

Romani activism 

In 2002, in order to strengthen the position of Romani literature world wide, Baltzar founded the International Roma Writers Association: A joint organization (IRWA) and acted as its president between 2002–2005.

Baltzar has been active in promoting Roma policies in Finland since 1965. Alongside other members of the Finnish Roma community, including artist Kiba Lumberg and percussionist Rainer Friman (fi), he has criticised Miranda Vuolasranta, President of the European Roma & Traveller Forum and suggested she leads conservatism in the Roma community who seek to downplay problems and exclude critical voices. 

In 2014, Baltzar organized an international minister-level The Conscience of Europe conference at the Finnish Parliament. The conference critically addressed the issues of multicultural society in Europe. The conference issued a 24-item set of proposals for law initiatives for reforming European policies of multiculturalism, which were then sent to European Commission.

Visual arts 

Veijo Baltzar has been engaged in the visual arts since the late 1960s. His works were presented at the exhibition for young artists in the Ateneum art museum in 1975. Since then Baltzar has had numerous exhibitions in different parts of Finland, Sweden and the Czech Republic. Since the 1980s Baltzar has also done architectural design.

Criminal case 

On November 21, 2019 Baltzar was detained for suspicion of human trafficking. On November 24, the newspaper Helsingin Sanomat published a multi page story about Baltzar's alleged inappropriate behaviour regarding young women, some of them underage, whom he had recruited to his theater productions.  The charges were subsequently dismissed.

Works
Novels by Veijo Baltzar (Tammi publishers):In Love and War (Sodassa ja rakkaudessa) (2008)Phuro (2000)The Black Tango (Musta tango) (1990)The Snake Trial Stone (Käärmeenkäräjäkivi) (1988)The Chrystall Ball of the Black Sara (Mustan Saaran kristallipallo) (1978)Mari (Mari) (1972)The Engagement of Blood (Verikihlat) (1969)The Burning Road (Polttava tie) (1968)

Plays by Veijo Baltzar (written and directed)

 Whole night plays

1981           The Black Scourge (Musta ruoska). Roma theatre Drom.
1982           The Hungry Cranes (Nälkäkurjet). Drom Theatre.
1980           The Crystal Ball of Black Sarah. A play for children. Performed in theatre Green Apple in Helsinki.
1983           I’ll Forge Stone to Be a Horse (Taon kivestä hevosen). Drom Theatre. Performed at the International Theatre Festival 22.–26.11.1985, Deutsches Schauspielhaus, Hamburg.
1984           Iron Nights (Rautayöt). Drom Theatre.
1986           Iron Horses (Rautaratsut). Drom Theatre.
1991           The God Is Great (Jumala on suuri). Passion play. 1993
1992           The Paradise of Gods (Jumalten Paratiisi). Kuopio Student Theatre.
1993           Backyard Carmen (Takapihan Carmen) 1993. Kuopio Student Theatre.
1993           The Gang (Jengi)
1993           The Dance (Tanssi)
1993           I Will Not Leave My Friend (Kaveria ei jätetä).
1996           The Forest of Women (Naisten metsä).
1997           Love and Mary (Rakkauteni Maria) Oratory.
1994-1997           ORLI, Folk opera. Premiere at the Imatra Cultural Center 1995. The second version premiered in March 1997 at Finlandia Hall, Helsinki.
2004           The Paradise of Gods (Jumalten Paratiisi).
2009           BOTOX.
2011           The God is Great (Jumala on Suuri).
2014           With the Seven-String Guitar. Gipsy cabaret. Premiere at the Alexander Theatre, Helsinki
'2016           Sin. A musical play. Premiere at the Alexander Theatre, HelsinkiPoetic plays1979           Muistan eläneeni (Remembrance of my life). Theatre Baltzar
1982           Tie (The Road). Drom.
1983           Yön kulkijat (Wanderers of the night), Theatre Drom
1983           Punainen hevonen (The Red Horse). Drom.
1985           Mustat kiharat (Black Curls). Drom.
2005           Mustalaisrunoteatteri (Gipsy Poetry Theatre).Others2012           “Sny” (Dreams). Prague's National Theatre, Nova Scena

 Prizes and awards 
1980           1st prize in the Golden Harp – competition, Dublin for the manuscript of short movie Punainen puutarha (the Red Garden)

1981           The theatre action of the year. Awarded by Finnish Theatre Center

1992           The Art award of the Province of Kuopio

1991           The Culture award of Rautalampi

1999           The 3rd prize in the international “Amico Rom” - competition. Italy

2000           The 2nd prize in the international “Amico Rom” - competition. Italy

2002           Arvo Turtiainen literature prize

2008           Mikael Agricola medal celebrating 40-year literary career. Helsinki, Tammi publishers

2011           An honorary title of Cultural Counsellor, kulttuurineuvos'', granted by the President of Finland Tarja Halonen

2016           Finalist and honorable mention (international recognition for 50-year activity for the benefit of European Roma), European Roma Spirit Award (ERSA). Bratislava, Slovakia

2017           Artist pension, granted by Arts Promotion Centre Finland as recognition for meritious artistic activity

References

Living people
Finnish writers
Romani writers
Finnish Romani people
1942 births